Božakovo (in older sources also Božjakovo,  or Boschiakou) is a village on the left bank of the Kolpa River in the Municipality of Metlika in the White Carniola area of southeastern Slovenia. The entire area is part of the traditional region of Lower Carniola and is now included in the Southeast Slovenia Statistical Region.

Name
Božakovo was attested in written sources as ecclesia … Marie Magdalene in 1334 and Wosiackh in 1490.

Church
The local church is dedicated to Mary Magdalene and belongs to the Parish of Metlika. It was built in the 18th century.

References

External links

Božakovo on Geopedia

Populated places in the Municipality of Metlika